B. celebensis may refer to:

 Babyrousa celebensis, the North Sulawesi babirusa, a pig-like animal
 Basilornis celebensis, the Sulawesi myna, a bird species
 Bonthainia celebensis, a species of harvestman (arachnid) belonging to the genus Bonthainia